The 2018–19 Monmouth Hawks men's basketball team represented Monmouth University in the 2018–19 NCAA Division I men's basketball season. They played their home games at OceanFirst Bank Center in West Long Branch, New Jersey as members of the Metro Atlantic Athletic Conference, and were led by 8th-year head coach King Rice. They finished the 2018–19 season 14–21 overall, 10–8 in MAAC play to finish in 6th place. As the 6th seed in the 2019 MAAC tournament, they defeated No. 11 seed Niagara in the first round 76–72, upset No. 3 seed Quinnipiac 98–92 in the quarterfinals, upset No. 2 seed Canisius 73–59 in the semifinals before losing to No. 1 seed Iona, 60–81 in the championship game.

Previous season
The Hawks finished the 2017–18 season 11–20, 7–11 in MAAC play to finish in a tie for seventh place. They lost in the first round of the MAAC tournament to Saint Peter's.

Roster

Schedule and results

|-
!colspan=12 style=| Exhibition

|-
!colspan=12 style=| Non-Conference Regular season

|-
!colspan=9 style=| MAAC regular season

|-
!colspan=12 style=| MAAC tournament
|-

|-

Source

References

Monmouth Hawks men's basketball seasons
Monmouth Hawks
Monmouth Hawks men's basketball team
Monmouth Hawks men's basketball team